Bernard Lewis (born 23 October 1997) is a Papua New Guinea international rugby league footballer who plays as a er for the Northern Pride in the Queensland Cup.

Early life
Lewis was born in Cairns, Queensland, Australia and is of Torres Strait Islander and Papua New Guinean descent. Lewis qualifies for Papua New Guinea via his mother, who is from Daru Island, an island of the Torres Strait governed by Papua New Guinea.

Playing career
Lewis won the 2016 National Youth League premiership with the Sydney Roosters before playing a leading role in the clubs 2017 Auckland Nines title run. 

The winger scored an 80 metre match winning try in their semi-final against the Melbourne Storm then went across for another in the final against Penrith.  

Lewis made his international debut for Papua New Guinea in their 24–6 loss to Samoa in the 2019 Oceania Cup. On 2 October 2019, Lewis was named in the Papua New Guinea team for the 2019 Rugby league World Cup 9s.

References

External links
Sydney Roosters profile

1997 births
Living people
Australian rugby league players
Australian people of Papua New Guinean descent
Torres Strait Islanders
Rugby league players from Cairns
Papua New Guinea national rugby league team players
Rugby league centres
Rugby league wingers